Mark Andrew Wasley (born 6 October 1965 in Subiaco, Western Australia) is a former Australian cricketer who played for Western Australia and then Tasmania. He made his debut for the Warriors in 1991 against Victoria, but with constant injuries and a change of scenery saw him  move to Tasmania for more chances. However, he was also frustrated there by the lack of opportunities. He is now involved with coaching the WACA Premier Cricket competition and is a well-known figure amongst cricket in Western Australia.

See also
 List of Tasmanian representative cricketers
 List of Western Australia first-class cricketers

External links
 

1965 births
Living people
Australian cricketers
Tasmania cricketers
Western Australia cricketers